Juan Ignacio Cabrera (born 27 February 2003) is a Uruguayan footballer who plays as a midfielder for German team Ingolstadt 04 II.

Club career
Born in Montevideo, Uruguay, Cabrera moved to Germany at the age of eight, having also lived in Argentina and Brazil. He started his footballing career with TuS Hiltrup and Preußen Münster before a move to Schalke 04 in 2016.

In October 2020, he was named by English newspaper The Guardian as one of the best players born in 2003 worldwide.

In September 2022, Cabrera moved to Ingolstadt 04.

International career
Having already represented Uruguay once at under-17 level, Cabrera played for Germany at under-19 level on two occasions in 2021. In 2022, he was called up to the Uruguay national under-20 football team for the first time.

Career statistics

Club

Notes

References

External links
 

2003 births
Living people
Footballers from Montevideo
Uruguayan footballers
Uruguay youth international footballers
German footballers
Germany youth international footballers
Uruguayan emigrants to Germany
Association football midfielders
Bayernliga players
SC Preußen Münster players
FC Schalke 04 players
FC Ingolstadt 04 players
FC Ingolstadt 04 II players